In the mathematical discipline of group theory, for a given group  the diagonal subgroup of the n-fold direct product  is the subgroup

This subgroup is isomorphic to

Properties and applications

 If  acts -transitively on  then the -fold diagonal subgroup acts transitively on  More generally, for an integer  if  acts -transitively on   acts -transitively on 
 Burnside's lemma can be proved using the action of the twofold diagonal subgroup.

See also 
Diagonalizable group

References
.

Group theory